Naphthol may refer to:

 1-Naphthol
 2-Naphthol